David Hartman is the name of:
David Hartman (rabbi) (1931–2013), American-Israeli rabbi
David Hartman (TV personality) (born 1935), American journalist